Congruence of triangles may refer to:

 Congruence (geometry)#Congruence of triangles
 Solution of triangles